Miss World 2014, the 64th edition of the Miss World pageant, was held on 14 December 2014 at the ExCeL London in London, United Kingdom. 121 contestants competed for the crown. Megan Young of the Philippines crowned her successor Rolene Strauss of South Africa at the end of the event. This is the second time that South Africa has won the title outright and the third time they have held the title.

Results

Placements

§ People's Choice winner

Continental Queens of Beauty

Challenge Events

Sports and Fitness

Beach Beauty 

– source:

Top Model

World Designer Award 

– source:

Talent 

– source:

Multimedia

Beauty with a Purpose

People's Choice Award 

– source:

Contestants
121 contestants competed for the crown and title.

Judges
The judges for Miss World 2014 were:
 Julia Morley – Chairman of the Miss World Organization
 Mike Dixon – Musical Director
 Rudy Salles – Member of the National Assembly of France
 Jody Reynolds – former president of Variety International
 Marsha-Rae Ratcliff – Variety International board member
 Tony Hatch – British most celebrated musical acts and films
 Agbani Darego – Miss World 2001 from Nigeria
 Azra Akın – Miss World 2002 from Turkey
 Zhang Zilin – Miss World 2007 from China
 Kaiane Aldorino – Miss World 2009 from Gibraltar
 Mike Dixon – Musical director

Notes

Special awards 

 Lifetime Beauty with a Purpose award – Miss World 1994, Aishwarya Rai Bachchan of India

Debuts

Returns

Last competed in 1960:
 
 Competed as 
Last competed in 2010:
 
Last competed in 2011:
 
Last competed in 2012:

Designations
  – Xhensila Pere was appointed Miss World Albania 2014 by Vera Grabocka, president of Miss & Mister Albania, only days before the start of the competition after she decided not to send Afroviti Goge who was previously appointed to represent the country.
  – Raquel Badillo was appointed Miss World Belize 2014 by Miss World Belize Ltd franchise holders for Miss World in Belize.
  – Yirgalem Hadish was appointed Miss World Ethiopia 2014 after a casting call was organised by Gadol Wilson, national director for Miss World in Ethiopia.
  – Eleni Kokkinou was appointed as Miss World Greece 2014 after a casting call was organised by Vassilis Prevelakis, national director for Miss World in Greece.
  – Wendy Métony was appointed Miss Monde Guadeloupe 2014. She was crowned Miss Intercontinental Tourism 2014 in Punta Cana, Dominican Republic earlier in 2014.
  – Monica Olivia Pedersen was appointed Miss World Norway 2014 after a casting call was organised by Morten Sommerfeldt, national director for Miss World in Norway.
  – Anaïs Delwaulle was appointed Miss Monde Martinique 2014 after no pageant was held. She was the 1st runner-up at Martinique Queens 2013 pageant.
  – Anastasia Kostenko was appointed as Miss World Russia 2014 after Miss Russia Organization decided to send the original winner of Miss Russia 2014 Yulia Alipova only to Miss Universe 2014 so as to avoid scheduling conflicts. Kostenko was the 2nd runner-up at the Miss Russia 2014 pageant.
  – Romina Fernandez has been appointed as Miss Mundo Uruguay 2014. She was the 1st runner-up at Miss Universe Uruguay 2014 pageant.
  – Nguyễn Thị Loan was appointed to represent Vietnam by Elite Model Vietnam, the franchise holder. She was among the Top 5 at the Miss Vietnam 2010 pageant and also the 2nd Runner-up at Miss Vietnam Ethnic 2013 pageant.

Replacements
  – Anissa Blondin replaced Miss Belgium 2014, Laurence Langen, for undisclosed reasons. Anissa Blondin was the 1st runner-up at the Miss Belgium 2014 pageant.
  – Jessie Lekery replaced Miss World Gabon 2014, Pulchérie Nzoughe, after Pulchérie Nzoughe resigned for unknown reasons. Jessie was Miss Gabon 2013 contestant.
  – Nadia Ntanu replaced Miss Ghana 2013, Guiseppine Baafi, after Guiseppine resigned her title. Nadia was the 2nd runner-up at the Miss Ghana 2012 pageant.
  – When the new Miss Hong Kong was crowned, Miss Hong Kong 2013, Grace Chan, was replaced by the Miss Hong Kong 2014 1st runner-up Erin Wong.
  – Yumara Lopez replaced Miss Mundo Nicaragua 2014, Maria Esther Cortes, after Maria stepped down due to personal reasons. Yumara was the 1st runner-up at the Miss Mundo Nicaragua 2014 pageant.
  – Nicole Pinto replaced Miss Mundo Panamá 2014, Raiza Erlenbaugh, after Raiza was dethroned for failing to fulfill her duties. Nicole was the 1st runner-up at Miss Mundo Panamá 2014 pageant and was later crowned Miss América Latina del Mundo 2014. Nicole resigned her title as Miss América Latina del Mundo 2014 to participate in Miss World 2014.
  – Zita Margarida Reis Oliveira replaced Miss World Portugal 2014, Catarina Sikiniotis, after Catarina chose not to sign a contract with her country's national organisation thereby forfeiting the right to participate in the Miss World 2014 pageant.
  – Dijana Cvijetić replaced the original winner of the Miss World Switzerland 2014 pageant, Aline Morger, after Aline stepped down for unknown reasons.
  – Thabiso Phiri was the original winner of Miss Zimbabwe 2014 pageant, however she resigned due to personal reasons, hence Catherine Makaya was crowned the new winner after an impromptu second contest was held in which both the runners-up refused to take part stating they were happy with their positions. But days before leaving for London, Catherine was dethroned for being too difficult to work with the Miss Zimbabwe Trust. The original Miss Zimbabwe 2014 1st princess, Tendai Humda replaced Makaya.

Withdrawals
 
 
 
 
 
 
 
  – María José Alvarado †
  – Madina Davletova
  – Martina Dimoska
 
  – Danielle Lelo
 
  – Michelle Malambo

Miss Honduras World 2014
In April 2014, María José Alvarado was crowned Miss Honduras World. She was expected to represent Honduras and was scheduled to fly to London, England for the Miss World pageant. On 19 November 2014, Alvarado and her sister Sofía Trinidad were found murdered and then buried in the village of Cablotales. Miss Honduras pageant organizers decided not to replace Alvarado and the country officially withdrew from the contest. On 23 November 2014, Miss World Organization Chairperson Julia Morley gave a special memorial service in remembrance for her and her sister.

References

Further reading
 "Miss World 2014: Aishwarya Rai Bachchan felicitated for being the most successful Miss World so far". CNN-IBN. 15 December 2014.

External links
 Miss World official website
 Miss South Africa Rolene Strauss is Miss World 2014 Winner

Miss World
2014 in London
2014 beauty pageants
Beauty pageants in the United Kingdom
December 2014 events in the United Kingdom
Events in London